Gordon Baldwin OBE  (born 1932 in Lincoln) is an English studio potter.

He attended the Lincoln School of Art where he was initially studied painting under Tony Bartl; it was here at Lincoln where he was first introduced to studio potter and ceramics tutor Robert Blatherwick who influenced his work. Baldwin later studied at the Central School of Art and Design (1950–53) and was teacher of Ceramics and Sculpture at Eton College for 39 years. Baldwin was awarded an OBE in 1992 and an honorary doctorate from the Royal College of Art, London in 2000.
He was influenced by contemporary sculpture and has worked with both earthenware and stoneware.

His work has been exhibited worldwide and is represented in many public collections.

See also 
Studio pottery

References 

1932 births
Living people
Officers of the Order of the British Empire
English potters
Alumni of the Central School of Art and Design